"Tarzan & Jane" is a song by Danish group Toy-Box from their debut album, Fantastic (1999). It was released as the lead single in 1998 in Germany and then re-released in 1999 to coincide with the premiere of Disney's Tarzan. The song became a top 10 hit in Denmark, the Netherlands, Norway, and Sweden. On the Eurochart Hot 100, "Tarzan & Jane" reached number 15. Outside Europe, it peaked at number 27 in New Zealand and number 41 in Australia.

Critical reception
In her review of the Fantastic album, AllMusic editor Heather Phares described "Tarzan & Jane" as a "youthful, catchy song". Chuck Taylor from Billboard called it an "ultra-kitschy track". He noted further that the formula here is "identical [to Aqua's "Barbie Girl"]: a husky, accented male vocal accompanied by a sweet, girly-girl chorus. The story this time is obvious enough, describing the jungle passion between Tarzan and Jane, accented by chimpanzee chuckles and our hero's signature swinging-through-the-trees cry." Pan-European magazine Music & Media commented that it is "one of the silliest songs to come along in quite some time, this nonetheless incredibly catchy slice of Europop was very successful in the Danish duo's home country, and is now sweeping across most of continental Europe. It could be argued that artists such as Steps, Dr. Bombay and Aqua—who enjoy such mass appeal—have created a general environment where fresh, energetic, lightweight pop can flourish."

Track listing
 German CD single
"Tarzan & Jane" (Single Version) – 2:59
"Tarzan & Jane" (Maxi Version) – 4:07

 UK & Europe CD Maxi-Single
"Tarzan & Jane" (Single Version) – 2:59
"Tarzan & Jane" (Maxi Version) – 4:07
"Tarzan & Jane" (Club Version) – 4:10

 US CD Maxi-Single
"Tarzan & Jane" (Single Version) – 2:59
"Tarzan & Jane" (Maxi Version) – 4:07
"Tarzan & Jane" (Club Version) – 4:10

 German 12" Vinyl
"Tarzan & Jane" (Single Version) – 2:59
"Tarzan & Jane" (Maxi Version) – 4:07
"Tarzan & Jane" (Club Version) – 4:10

Charts

Weekly charts

Year-end charts

References

1998 debut singles
1999 singles
Toy-Box songs
Edel AG singles
English-language Danish songs
Mega Records singles
Victor Entertainment singles
Works based on Tarzan
Tarzan parodies
Songs about fictional male characters
Songs about fictional female characters
Music based on novels
Songs about Africa
1998 songs